Jennifer Lee Garfein Ashton (born April 23, 1969) is a physician, author, and television correspondent. She is chief health and medical editor and chief medical correspondent for ABC News and Good Morning America, chief women's health correspondent for The Dr. Oz Show, and a columnist for Cosmopolitan Magazine. Dr. Ashton is also a regular contributor to the ABC daytime program GMA3: What You Need to Know. She is also a frequent guest speaker and moderator for events raising awareness of women's health issues.

Early life and education 
Ashton was born in California to Oscar Garfein, a New York City cardiologist, and Dorothy Garfein, a registered nurse. Her brother, Evan Garfein, is chief of plastic surgery and reconstructive surgery at Montefiore Hospital in New York City.

She attended Horace Mann School in Riverdale, New York City, where she studied French and English.

In 1991, she graduated from Columbia College, Columbia University, with a bachelor's degree in art history.

She received her medical degree from Columbia College of Physicians and Surgeons in 2000.

In 2016, she received her master's degree in nutrition from Columbia University.

Career
A board-certified obstetrician and gynecologist, Ashton completed her residency at St. Luke's–Roosevelt Hospital Center (now Mount Sinai Morningside) in New York.

She has practiced as an attending physician at Englewood Hospital and Medical Center, an affiliate of Mount Sinai Medical Center in Englewood, New Jersey, and is currently in private practice.

Ashton has authored numerous magazine articles and contributed to a health blog for The Record of Bergen, New Jersey. In addition, she has written three books: The Body Scoop for Girls (2009), which educates teenage girls on the topic of puberty; Your Body Beautiful (2012), which addresses health and wellness issues in middle-aged women; and Eat This When You're Expecting, Not That (2016), in which she outlines a diet designed specifically for pregnant women.
 
Ashton launched her television career in 2006 as the first female medical contributor to the Fox News Channel. She appeared on TLC's A Baby Story, on PBS, and on Oprah & Friends XM radio's The Dr. Oz Show.

She joined CBS News as a medical correspondent in 2009, contributing to all CBS media platforms, with regular appearances on CBS Evening News with Katie Couric and The Early Show. She remains a featured expert commentator on WCBS Radio and its national affiliates.

Ashton co-hosted the short-lived ABC television series The Revolution, canceled in April 2012 due to poor viewership.

She joined the ABC News medical unit as senior medical contributor in 2012, making regular appearances on Good Morning America and ABC World News Tonight.

In 2013 she became an on-air personality for the daytime talk show The Doctors.

As of March 2020, she has been a co-host during showings of GMA3: What You Need to Know (formerly Pandemic: What You Need to Know).

Personal life
On August 31, 1996, Jennifer married Robert Ashton Jr, a thoracic and cardiac surgeon and later had two children, Chloë and Alex. They divorced in January 2017. On February 11, 2017, two weeks after the divorce was finalized, Robert, 52, died by suicide by jumping off the George Washington Bridge. On June 6, 2018, after news of Kate Spade's suicide broke, Ashton went public about her ex-husband's death during an interview with colleague George Stephanopoulos on Good Morning America. She became engaged to Boston Red Sox chairman Tom Werner in January 2022. They were married on November 5, 2022, at the Harmonie Club in New York City.

Ashton has revealed that she learned Transcendental Meditation through the David Lynch Foundation.

Bibliography
 The Body Scoop for Girls: A Straight-Talk Guide to a Healthy, Beautiful You, Jennifer Ashton with Christine Larson, 2009, .
 Your Body Beautiful: Clockstopping Secrets to Staying Healthy, Strong, and Sexy in Your 30s, 40s, and Beyond, Jennifer Ashton with Christine Rojo, 2012. 
 Eat This When You're Expecting, Not That: Your Complete Guide to the Very Best Foods For Every Stage of Pregnancy, Jennifer Ashton, and David Zinczenko, 2016. 
 Life After Suicide: Finding Courage, Comfort & Community After Unthinkable Loss, Jennifer Ashton, 2019.

Awards and honors
In 2007, Ashton was recognized as a Woman of Achievement by the Girl Scouts of Northern New Jersey.  In 2008, she received the Hope for The Future Award from The Octoberwoman Foundation for Breast Cancer Awareness.

References

External links
 Professional practice page
 Profile on Vitals.com
 
 

1969 births
Living people
American gynecologists
Columbia University Vagelos College of Physicians and Surgeons alumni
People from San Bernardino County, California
American women physicians
Physicians from California
ABC News people
CBS News people
Columbia College (New York) alumni
Women gynaecologists
21st-century American women